Claudette Wells (born February 20, 1954 in St. Louis, Missouri) is an American actress and voice actress who is best known for her roles as LaDonna Fredericks in Square Pegs. She is also known for her role as Peggy Harley on A Different World and her voice work in numerous movies including Dawn of the Dead (2004) and Barnyard (2006).

Career 
Her best known role is as LaDonna Fredericks on Square Pegs from 1982 - 1983. She was the only black character in the cast. She became and stayed best friends in real life with co-star Tracy Nelson. They also played best friends on the show.

She also played Peggy Harley on A Different World (1988), Bindi in the Donna Mills TV movie False Arrest (1991), Maxine in the unaired CBS sitcom The Elvira Show (1993), and Ms. Tweesbury in Father's Day (1997).

She had roles in many television series including Father Dowling Investigates, The Steve Harvey Show, Melrose Place, Double Trouble, Not Necessarily the News, and Pursuit of Happiness.

As a voice actress, she worked on CBS Storybreak, the video game Transformers: The Game (2007), and many major movies including Mulan (1998), What Lies Beneath (2000), Shrek (2001), Wonder Boys (2001), 40 Days and 40 Nights (2002), Kill Bill (2003), The Chronicles of Riddick (2004), The Skeleton Key (2005), Barnyard (2006),The X Files: I Want to Believe (2008), Bride Wars (2009), The Princess and the Frog (2009), Brüno (2009), Turbo (2013), and the Bob's Burgers Movie (2022).

References

External links
 

Living people
American film actresses
American television actresses
American voice actresses
1954 births
21st-century American women